The Tomb of Fu Hao is an archaeological site at Yinxu, the ruins of the ancient Shang dynasty capital Yin, within the modern city of Anyang in Henan Province, China. Discovered in 1976 by Zheng Zhenxiang, it was identified as the final resting place of the queen and military general Fu Hao, who died about 1200 BCE and was likely the Lady Hao inscribed on oracle bones by king Wu Ding and one of his many wives.

It is to date the only Shang royal tomb found intact with its contents and excavated by archaeologists.  The excavation was conducted by the Anyang Working Team of the Archaeological Institute of the Chinese Academy of Social Sciences, and after extensive restoration the tomb was opened to the public in 1999.

Discovery and contents

In 1976 Zheng Zhenxiang and her archaeological team were probing the area around Yinxu with a long shovel, called a Luoyang shovel, and recovered some samples of red lacquer. The burial pit uncovered, officially titled tomb number 5, is a single pit, 5.6 metres by 4 m, just outside the main royal cemetery. The tomb has been dated to around 1200 BCE and identified, from inscriptions on ritual bronzes, to be that of Fu Hao.

Her tomb, one of the smaller tombs, is one of the best-preserved Shang dynasty royal tombs and the only one not to have been looted before excavation. Inside the pit was evidence of a wooden chamber 5 meters long, 3.5 m wide and 1.3 m high containing a lacquered wooden coffin that has since completely rotted away.

The floor level housed the royal corpse and most of the utensils and implements buried with her.  Rare jade artifacts, such as those of the Liangzhu culture, were probably collected by Fu Hao as antiques. While some of the bronze artifacts were probably used by the lady and her household, others inscribed with her posthumous name of Mu Xin were undoubtedly cast as grave goods. The artifacts unearthed within the grave consisted of:
755 jade objects (including Longshan, Liangzhu, Hongshan and Shijiahe cultural artifacts)
564 bone objects (including 500 hairpins and 20 arrowheads)
468 bronze objects, including over 200 ritual bronze vessels, 130 weapons, 23 bells, 27 knives, 4 mirrors, and 4 tiger statues
63 stone objects
11 pottery objects
5 ivory objects
6,900 cowry shells (used as currency during the Shang dynasty)
Below the corpse was a small pit holding the remains of six sacrificial dogs, and along the edge lay the skeletons of 16 human slaves, evidence of human sacrifice.

There is also evidence above ground of a structure built over the tomb that probably served as an ancestral hall for holding memorial ceremonies; this has since been restored.

By connecting the jade artifact in the tomb of Fu Hao to much earlier artifact through stylistic and technical analysis, the archaeological context has identified an early collector, a woman who gathered about her artifacts of a much earlier period.

See also
Tomb of Marquis Yi of Zeng, dated to 433 BCE, the other major Chinese royal tomb found intact.

References

Further reading

External links
Website on the tomb
10 minute documentary feature, part 1 of 7

1976 archaeological discoveries
Archaeological sites in China
Buildings and structures in Henan
Shang dynasty
Tombs in China
Yinxu